Nikolay Vladimirovich Pankratov (born December 23, 1982 in Sverdlovsk) is a Russian cross-country skier who competed between 1999 and 2013. He won two medals in the 4 × 10 km at the FIS Nordic World Ski Championships with a silver in 2007 and a bronze in 2005, and finished 10th in the 15 km + 15 km double pursuit at the 2005 championships in Oberstdorf.

Pankratov also finished eighth in the 4 × 10 km event at the 2010 Winter Olympics in Vancouver. His only individual win was in a 10 km event in Italy in 2003.

In 2010, Pankratov was allegedly caught with the forbidden substance actovegin when crossing the border to Switzerland.

Cross-country skiing results
All results are sourced from the International Ski Federation (FIS).

Olympic Games

World Championships
 2 medals – (1 silver, 1 bronze)

World Cup

Individual podiums
1 victory – (1 )
4 podiums – (3 , 1 )

Team podiums
 2 victories – (1 , 1 )
 9 podiums – (7 , 2 )

References

External links
 

Russian male cross-country skiers
1982 births
Living people
Cross-country skiers at the 2006 Winter Olympics
Cross-country skiers at the 2010 Winter Olympics
Olympic cross-country skiers of Russia
Sportspeople from Yekaterinburg
FIS Nordic World Ski Championships medalists in cross-country skiing
Universiade medalists in cross-country skiing
Universiade gold medalists for Russia
Competitors at the 2003 Winter Universiade